A Different Breed of Killer was an American deathcore band from Knoxville, Tennessee. They released their debut album, I, Colossus, on April 29, 2008.

History

Formed in October 2006, A Different Breed of Killer quickly made a name for themselves in the deathcore scene. Less than a year after their formation, the band signed with Rise Records and released I, Colossus, which received generally positive reviews. The band has toured with such bands as Whitechapel, Through the Eyes of the Dead, and Impending Doom.

Recently, A Different Breed Of Killer have announced they are preparing their second full-length to be titled The City. The album will be produced by the band's drummer Nija Walker, who has been a student of recording technologies for 8 years, and worked directly under world-renowned mastering engineer Seva at SoundCurrent Mastering in Knoxville, TN. The album will also be mastered by Seva. Also unique to this recording is plans to record, mix and master the entire album in Dolby Digital 5.1 Surround sound. The band stated "to our knowledge this is the first time this process has been applied to a death metal record."

The band has also announced that they have left Rise Records and are in the process of securing a new label for The City.

Some of the members are in a new band named Persaeus.

In 2016, the band announced that their new vocalist was Kevin Bivins of American deathcore bands Senor Bivins and What Lies Beneath. Bivins also announced the album would be released soon and that he designed the artwork for it. On June 27, 2016, nearly 8 years after the release of I, Colossus, the band made an announcement that "The Devouring Storm", the single from their second album The City, will be released on July 9, with the full album supposedly coming in November 2016. The band has also started an Indiegogo campaign to fund the album.
The album was released on May 27, 2017, and the band's last Facebook post was on August 12, 2017. There has been no activity of the band since.

Band Members

Final Line-Up
 Nija Walker– drums (2006–2017)
 Louie Thal – bass guitar (2007–2017)
 Ethan Brown - guitar (2006–2017)
 Kevin Bivins - vocals (2016–2017)
 Trevor McKee – guitar, vocals (2006-2008, 2016–2017)

Former Members
 Patrick Hamilton - vocals (2006-2007)
 Klint Monroe - vocals (2008-2010)
 Kyle McNulty – bass guitar (2006-2007)
 Nathan Palmer - guitar (2008-2010)
 Jesse Mainor – vocals (2006-2008, 2012, 2016-2017)

Discography
 Studio albums
 I, Colossus (2008)
 The City (2017)
Demos
 07 Demo (2007)

References

Musical groups established in 2006
Musical groups disestablished in 2010
Musical groups reestablished in 2012
Heavy metal musical groups from Tennessee
Rise Records artists
American deathcore musical groups
Musical quartets
Musical groups from Knoxville, Tennessee
Musical groups disestablished in 2013
Musical groups reestablished in 2016